C. tinctoria may refer to:
 Chromodoris tinctoria, a colorful sea slug species
 Chrozophora tinctoria, a plant species
 Collinsia tinctoria, the sticky Chinese house, a flowering plant species
 Collomia tinctoria, the staining collomia, a flowering plant species
 Coreopsis tinctoria, the plains coreopsis or calliopsis, an annual forb species

Synonyms
 Caesalpinia tinctoria or Coulteria tinctoria, two synonyms for Cæsalpinia spinosa, the tara tree, a small tree species native to Peru

See also
 Tinctoria